YMCA F.C. may refer to:

Dumfries YMCA F.C., a Scottish football club from the town of Dumfries in Scotland
Horsham YMCA F.C., a football club based in Horsham, West Sussex, England
Mount Merrion YMCA F.C., a football club based in Mount Merrion, Dublin, Ireland.
YMCA FC (East Timor), a football club of East Timor based in Dili
YMCA F.C. (Belfast), a former Irish football club based in Belfast, formed by the members of the Belfast YMCA
YMCA F.C. (Dublin), an Irish football club based in Sandymount, Dublin